Marcin Budziński (born 6 July 1990) is a Polish professional footballer who plays as a midfielder for Cracovia II.

Career 
He made his first appearance in the Ekstraklasa in September 2008.

International career 
Marcin Budziński formerly played for the Poland U-21. team. Previously, he played for Poland U-19.

Club career 
Between 2008 and 2017, Budziński featured in the Ekstraklasa, the top flight of the Polish football system, where he played 200 matches for club sides Arka Gdynia and Cracovia.

In September 2017 Budziński transferred to Melbourne City of Australia's A-League as one of the club's marquee players. In June 2018, he and Melbourne City mutually terminated his contract.

Budziński returned to Arka Gdynia in the beginning of August 2019. However, on 31 January 2020, his contract was terminated by mutual consent.

Career statistics

Club

1All appearances in Ekstraklasa Cup.

References

External links 
 
 UEFA.com - Budziński back from the brink in Poland
 

1990 births
People from Giżycko
Sportspeople from Warmian-Masurian Voivodeship
Living people
Polish footballers
Polish expatriate footballers
Poland youth international footballers
Poland under-21 international footballers
Association football midfielders
Arka Gdynia players
MKS Cracovia (football) players
Melbourne City FC players
Radomiak Radom players
Stal Mielec players
Ekstraklasa players
I liga players
A-League Men players
Marquee players (A-League Men)
Polish expatriate sportspeople in Australia
Expatriate soccer players in Australia